The following are lists of recreational walks in Hampshire, England:

Short Walks
Blackwater Valley Path, Hollybush Pits to Coleford Bridge Near The Quays Grid ref: SU 886 534
Grange Farm, a series of circular walks at Tichborne, south of New Alresford
Hamble Common has a waymarked circular walk
The Hayling Billy Trail (part of which is called the Hayling Billy Coastal Path), runs from the centre of Havant to the south of Hayling Island
Itchen Valley Country Park has various waymarked trails.
Mottisfont Abbey Estate Walk, near Romsey — 11 kilometres.
Ober Water walks of 1.5 and 2 kilometres at Whitefield Moor near Brockenhurst
Pilcot Farm circular walk from Dogmersfield (to the west of Fleet)
Pucknall Farm circular walk, starting from behind the Wheatsheaf Inn at Braishfield near Romsey
Queen Elizabeth Country Park near Petersfield contains a total of about 32 kilometres of trails and paths
Sydmonton Common walk, a circular walk to the south of the A339 near Bishop's Green
Tall Trees Trail, 2 kilometre circular from either Blackwater or Brock Hill near Brockenhurst
The Vyne circular walks, signposted off the A340 road north of Basingstoke
West End farm, circular walks at Upper Froyle between Farnham and Alton
West Walk near Bere, 2 circular walks described as being 1 and 2 hours duration respectively
Wilverley Wander, 3 kilometres from Wilverley Plain between Brockenhurst and Burley

Longer walks
Blackwater Valley Path, 37 kilometres, Hampshire and Berkshire
Clarendon Way, 38.5 kilometres from Salisbury to Winchester
Hangers Way, 34 kilometres from Alton to Queen Elizabeth Country Park outside Petersfield
Meon Valley Trail, 16 kilometres from Wickham to West Meon
Soberton and Newtown Millennium Walk 2000, 16 kilometre circular walk
Staunton Way, 33 kilometres
Strawberry Trail, a 24 kilometre circular walk

Long-distance paths
Avon Valley Path, 54.5 kilometres Christchurch to Salisbury (Hampshire and Wiltshire)
Bournemouth Coast Path, 59.5 kilometres from Sandbanks to Milford-on-Sea (Dorset and Hampshire)
Hampshire Millennium Pilgrims Trail, 48 kilometres from Winchester to Portsmouth
Itchen Way, 43.5 kilometres from Hinton Ampner to Woolston, Hampshire
King's Way, 72 kilometres from Winchester to Portchester
Solent Way, Christchurch — Emsworth 112 kilometres
South Downs Way National Trail, 160 kilometres from Winchester to Eastbourne, East Sussex
St. Swithun's Way, 55 kilometres Winchester to Farnham, Surrey
Test Way, 70.5 kilometres from Walbury Hill, Berkshire to Totton
Three Castles Path, Windsor to Winchester, 96 kilometres (unwaymarked)
Wayfarers Walk, 110 kilometres from Walbury Hill to Emsworth (Berkshire, Hampshire)
Brenda Parker Way, 125 km from Andover to Aldershot

See also
Long-distance footpaths in the UK

External links
A comprehensive guide to walking and cycling in Hampshire
Hampshire Council's walks guide
The Rural Development Service Walks and Rides in the South East page — has a pdf file detailing walks in Hampshire.
 Forestry Commission walks in Hampshire
 Maps showing permissive footpaths in and around Froyle
The Ramblers' Association website gives details of  three urban walks in the Portsmouth area
 bestwalks.com page of books for sale describing walks in Hampshire
A selection of walks in the New Forest, Keyhaven Marshes & nearby Milford on Sea

For great looped walks in Hampshire with history , facts and lots of fun go to Rob's Hampshire Pub Walks

Environment of Hampshire
 
Hampshire
British entertainment-related lists